Albert Bogen (born Albert Bógathy; October 31, 1882 – July 14, 1961) was a fencer who competed for Austria-Hungary at the 1912 Summer Olympics and for Hungary at the 1928 Summer Olympics.

Bogen was Jewish, and was born in Kikinda, Serbia. His daughter was Hungarian fencer Erna Bogen-Bogáti, who won a bronze medal in women's individual foil at the 1932 Summer Olympics and was the wife of Hungarian fencer Aladár Gerevich who won gold medals in sabre in six Olympics and mother of Olympic medalist Pál Gerevich who won two Olympic bronze medals in team sabre. He was part of the Austrian sabre team, which won the silver medal. After qualifying for the individual sabre quarterfinals, he did not compete in this stage.

See also
List of select Jewish fencers

References

External links
profile

1882 births
1961 deaths
20th-century Serbian people
Fencers at the 1912 Summer Olympics
Fencers at the 1928 Summer Olympics
Jewish male sabre fencers
Medalists at the 1912 Summer Olympics
Olympic fencers of Austria
Olympic fencers of Hungary
Olympic medalists in fencing
Olympic silver medalists for Austria
Serbian Jews
Serbian male épée fencers
Sportspeople from Kikinda
Jewish male épée fencers
Serbian male sabre fencers

Hungarian male sabre fencers
Hungarian male épée fencers
Sportspeople from the Austro-Hungarian Empire